Frank "Pep" Leadlay (born March 7, 1898, in Hamilton, Ontario, died September 8, 1984, in Hamilton, Ontario) was a star football player in  the Canadian Football League for seven seasons for the Hamilton Tigers. On October 15, 1927 he kicked a record 5 field goals, all on drop kicks. He was inducted into the Canadian Football Hall of Fame in 1963 and into the Canada's Sports Hall of Fame in 1975.

References
 Canada's Sports Hall of Fame profile

External links
 

1898 births
1984 deaths
Sportspeople from Hamilton, Ontario
Players of Canadian football from Ontario
Hamilton Tigers football players
Queen's Golden Gaels football players
Canadian Football Hall of Fame inductees